Danny Morgan (born May 29, 1961) is an American former professional boxer who competed from 1986 to 1993. He twice challenged for the WBA super middleweight title between 1990 and 1993.

Professional career
Morgan made his professional debut against Charles Minty on May 1, 1986, winning by unanimous decision in a six-round bout. Morgan fought an opponent with a winning record for the first time in his fourth professional bout, defeating 14-3-1 Scott Papasadora on points in September 1987. Thereafter Morgan became a frequent sight in US boxing rings, fighting 21 times in 1988, including four times in the month of April alone. During this time Morgan's most notable wins were over 21-1-4 Quinton Fox, 20-10-3 Mike Pollitt, and 29-7-2 Wilbert Johnson. In November 1990 Morgan, sporting a record of 38-0, was matched against 27-0 Christophe Tiozzo for the WBA super middleweight title, a fight which lost by 2nd-round TKO. In the remainder of his career Morgan would lose fights to Steve Collins, Michael Nunn, and Marc Randazzo, while tallying wins against two unknowns. The Randazzo fight would be Morgan's last, and he would retire with a professional record of 40-4 with 28 wins by knockout. Morgan was inducted into the Minnesota Boxing Hall of Fame in 2017.

References

External links
 

1961 births
Living people
Super-middleweight boxers
Boxers from Minnesota
American male boxers
Sportspeople from Minneapolis